Jesús Alberto Chong (born 7 January 1965) is a Mexican former professional boxer. He is a former Mexican National, NABF, and the WBO Light Flyweight Champion.

Professional career
Chong, who is of Chinese Mexican heritage, made his professional debut on September 1, 1987. In just his 11th fight in 1990, he lost a close eight-round decision to future five-time champion Johnny Tapia. Later in that same year he won his first world title, the International Boxing Council (IBC) Championship against Francisco Montiel. In 1991, he lost to five-time champion Michael Carbajal by unanimous decision.

NABF Light Flyweight title
In September 1992 he beat Porfirio Danny Núnez to defend his NABF Light Flyweight Championship, that he won by beating Francisco Montiel in a rematch earlier that year. He won the Mexican Light Flyweight Championship by upsetting veteran Raul Rios by T.K.O. in tenth round, and would go on to make 9 defences of his National Championship. Chong defended the title until 1995 when he lost to Edgar Cardenas via disqualification.

WBO Light Flyweight title
On May 31, 1997 in Caesars Palace, Las Vegas, Nevada Jesús Alberto won the WBO Light Flyweight title by defeating Eric Griffin with a second round T.K.O. He would go on to lose his title in a twelve-round decision to Melchor Cob Castro. Castro was docked two points during the fight for low blows against Chong.

Retirement
Chong went on to lose nine of his last ten fights and decided on retiring in 2003 at the age of 38.

See also
List of Mexican boxing world champions
List of light-flyweight boxing champions

References

External links

Mexican people of Chinese descent
Boxers from Durango
People from Gómez Palacio, Durango
Light-flyweight boxers
World light-flyweight boxing champions
World Boxing Organization champions
1965 births
Living people
Mexican male boxers